A mariner's cap, variations of which are known as skipper cap, Greek fisherman's cap, fiddler cap or Breton cap, Lenin cap and Mao cap, is a soft, flat-topped cap with a small visor, usually made from black or navy blue wool felt, but also occasionally from corduroy or blue denim. It is distinguished from similar caps, such as the peaked cap and maciejówka, by its soft, unstructured crown. It is often associated with seamanship and maritime settings, especially fishing, yachting and recreational sailing. It has become popular amongst the public in general, rather than staying isolated as an occupational hat. One example of it being put in prominence in popular culture was when it was worn by John Lennon during the British Invasion of the mid-1960s.

Eastern and Central Europe

Caps of this type were introduced during the first quarter of the 19th century, as cheap and practical workwear for sailors and factory workers in Europe. These were particularly popular in Russia, especially among the urban Jewish community, and later gained the nickname fiddler cap due to their use by Topol as Tevye the Milkman in the film adaptation of Fiddler on the Roof.

A black version of this cap, with a narrow crown and a band embroidered with foliage, was known as a kasket or Hamburg cap. It was introduced in response to the Tsarist authorities banning more traditional Jewish headwear in 19th-century Russia, and was later commonly seen on Kibbutz farmers in Israel during the 1950s. This hat was worn daily by Hasidic Jewish boys in Britain, Germany, Russia, Poland, and America from the early Victorian era until the mid 20th century, but in the present day it is generally restricted to Shabbat and other formal occasions.

Leading Old Bolsheviks including Vladimir Lenin, Leon Trotsky, Felix Dzerzhinsky, and Joseph Stalin also favored these caps during the Russian Revolution and Russian Civil War. Dark blue and army green variants with a red star badge later became part of the uniform for Great Patriotic War era political commissars along with a black leather reefer jacket. Similar caps were also worn by socialists from other countries, including Chinese Communist Party chairman Mao Zedong and, more recently, former British Labour Party leader Jeremy Corbyn.

Popularity in Western Europe

By the 1880s, caps of this type were widespread in Greece, and featured a decorative cord chinstrap, and a distinctive black embroidered ribbon on the peak. The traditional costume for many Greek coastal villagers, comprising the cap, roll neck sweater, loose trousers, and tall boots featured in the film adaptation of The Guns of Navarone, as the disguise for the British agents. Black or navy blue variants with a white crown known as Tellermutzen were also commonly worn by university students in Germany, Denmark, and Sweden from the turn of the century until the present day.

As workwear
Black or navy blue caps of this type served as workwear for merchant navy sailors throughout the 20th century. Caps with decorative gold braid, either in the standard navy blue or with a white top, were favored by the skippers of sailing yachts, motor boats, and other small pleasure craft. From the 1930s until the 1970s  a waterproof version, known as a mechanic's cap, was worn with a blue boiler suit (coveralls) as part of the uniform for truckers, gas station employees and breakdown men. In the 1950 edition of Tintin and the Land of Black Gold, Thomson and Thompson wear these caps when they go undercover as Autocart mechanics.

Modern use

During the 1950s, black leather variants of the Greek Fisherman's cap were popular among the Ton-up boy and Greaser subculture, due to their use by Marlon Brando in The Wild One. These appear in The Warriors as part of the uniform of the Rogues gang. Similar caps embellished with chains and metal studs were worn by many members of the 1970s black power movement as an alternative to the beret. At the same time, a knitted grey or black version, resembling a wool Rasta hat with a leather peak, gained popularity among some expatriate Jamaican Rastafarians in Britain and the US to accommodate their dreadlocks.

From the mid to late 1960s, the Greek Fisherman's cap became a desirable counterculture accessory for both sexes, due to its use by The Beatles during their US tour, and by folk musicians such as Bob Dylan, Woody Guthrie, and Donovan. The cap underwent a revival among young British hipster women during the late 1990s, and again during the 2010s due to a nostalgia for 1970s fashion.

See also
Sou'wester
Flat cap
Peaked cap
Forage cap
Kasket
Baseball cap

References

External links

Hats
Caps
1960s fashion
1970s fashion
2010s fashion
Greek clothing
Russian clothing
Victorian fashion
19th-century fashion
20th-century fashion
Maritime culture